We in Music is an album by Doping Panda, released May 5, 2004, on NIW! Records.

Track listing
 Introgical (we in music)
 Start me up
 Mr.Superman
 Uncovered
 Party song
 Lovers Soca
 Interlude
 Turn of the silence
 DHA-DHI-DHA
 Stairs
 One foot out my life

2004 albums